Thomas Charles Greenhalgh is a multimedia artist and singer-songwriter best known for his work with the Mekons.

Education
He attended Sevenoaks School in Kent with future members of the Gang of Four (Andy Gill and Jon King) and the Mekons (Kevin Lycett and Mark White, whose father taught art at the school), and they spent "a lot of time in the art room."

After Sevenoaks, the five attended the University of Leeds, the birthplace of a number of punk bands. As students in the Fine Arts program, Greenhalgh, Lycett, White and Jon Langford formed the Mekons in 1976; they worked closely with the Gang of Four and the Delta 5, bands that included students from the same programme. In the politically charged atmosphere of the late 1970s, they participated in events such as Rock Against Racism.

While primarily credited as a guitarist in the early Mekons recordings, Greenhalgh's roles as lead singer and songwriter came to the forefront after the band regrouped and evolved stylistically in the 1980s.

Music and art

The Mekons have been known for their visual art projects as well as their music, the four main contributors being Greenhalgh, Langford, Lycett and Eric Bellis (Rico Bell). Each has a distinct style; Greenhalgh's work often incorporates elements of collage, painterly brushwork and unusual, flattened perspective. His illustration for the cover of The Curse of the Mekons and United is one of the band's most recognisable logos. The Mekons have held a number of gallery exhibitions, and have also participated in projects such as Art-Tube 01. While a member of the London-based music community, he participated in the music conference musicalliance (now known as modal), for which he set up the Mekons' art installation Untitled at the Spitz.

Along with Lycett, Greenhalgh has served as the primary web-master for Mekon-related sites such as the Wonderful World of the Mekons and OOOH! With fellow Mekon Lu Edmonds and others, Greenhalgh has also worked on Ellipsis's project for PORT: Navigating Digital Culture (1997).

Greenhalgh has taken part in a number of Mekons-related projects, many of which include Jon Langford. In 1985, he was The Three Johns' sound engineer for their first American tour; a recording of their Chicago performance has been released as Live in Chicago. As a member of the Jelly Bishops, he collaborated with Langford and John Hyatt, releasing the album Kings of Barstool Mountain (1988). He and Langford appear in Gary Lucas's 1993 video, "Skin the Rabbit," and they share song-writing credits for "On the Streets," featured on The Return of Rico Bell (1996). Greenhalgh has also performed on the Langford-organised Pine Valley Cosmonauts albums, contributing a cover of Hank Williams's "Angel of Death" to 2003's anti-death penalty benefit, The Executioner's Last Songs Vol. 2 & 3. His guitar (and Langford's vocals) can be heard on fellow-Mekon Sally Timms's "Corporal Chalkie" from her 2004 album, In the World of Him.

On 13 June 2007, Greenhalgh's new band King Tommy's Velvet Runway débuted in London. This band features Therese Daniell on keyboards and guitar, Tam McGibbon on banjo, John Langley on drums and Meiling Daniell-Greenhalgh on vocals and violin. The band's first album, Dance on the Volcano, saw a special limited edition release in 2007.

Independent projects
With Kevin Lycett, Steve Goulding, and John Gill, Greenhalgh has also been a member of Edward II and the Red Hot Polkas, appearing on Let's Polkasteady (1987) and Two Step to Heaven (1989).  With Lycett and Robert Worby, he participated in Leeds Metropolitan University's A Christmas Pudding for Henry (1999) with the mecity multimedia project.  Since around 1991, he and Worby have collaborated on Plate, recording yet-unreleased experimental electronic music.  With fellow-Mekon Sarah Corina, he has recorded some songs on ukuleles and banjoleles, a sample ("Lowlands of Holland") of which was heard on ResonanceFM's Clear Spot in 2002, a program that also featured Lu Edmonds.

Greenhalgh produced Michelle Shocked's cover of the Beatles' "Lovely Rita" for the compilation Sgt. Pepper Knew My Father (1988).  He also produced Mush's second album, Face in Space (1998).  In 1998, he worked on a remix with the Knights of the Occasional Table.  In 2000, Curve guitarist Alex Mitchell and he (as DJ Sparky Lightbourne and DJ Tommy Tomtom) appeared at the Foundry in Shoreditch.

At one time, Greenhalgh was also a part-time art instructor.

Intensely private and cheeky, Greenhalgh has managed to downplay his contributions to the art and music communities for much of his career.  Following a move from his long-time residence in London to Somerset, he relocated to Hong Kong between 2003 and 2005, and is rumoured to have since returned to England.

External links
 Myspace: King Tommy's Velvet Runway
 Gang of Four:Not Great Men
 Delta 5
 The Mekons LaunchCast Page
 Interview with Pitch.com
 Video
 Interview
 Artwork

1956 births
Living people
People educated at Sevenoaks School
Alumni of the University of Leeds
British male singers
The Mekons members